Deming is a surname of English origin, and may refer to:

Adelaide Deming, American artist
Barbara Deming, American feminist
Claiborne P. Deming, American businessman
David Deming, a noted scientist and writer, a professor at the University of Oklahoma
Calvin Deming (1896-1963), American politician
Edwin Willard Deming (1860–1942), artist
John Deming, English colonial settler of the Connecticut Colony
Lawson J. Deming, American radio and TV actor
Olcott Deming (1909–2007), American diplomat and ambassador
Peter Deming, American cinematographer
W. Edwards Deming, American statistician and quality expert
William Deming (politician) (1833–1891), American politician and physician